Zlatopil (also as the Russian transliteration Zlatopol) was a small city in Ukraine, located about 67 km northwest of Kropyvnytskyi.

History 
The name of this village before 1787 was Hulajpol. During the partitions of Poland many residents of the town resettled near the Sea of Azov establishing another town of Huliaipole. In ХІХ century Zlatopol was the center of Zlatopol volost, Chigirinsky Uyezd, Kiev Governorate. In 1923–1959 Zlatopil was an administrative center of Zlatopil Raion. Since 1959 it is part of Novomyrhorod city.

Before the Holocaust, Zlatopil was a prosperous Jewish shtetl. There was also a gymnasium (school) for rich people in Zlatopil. Some Jews of Zlatopil served in the Russian army during World War I and suffered under the pogroms of 1918–1920. Those who remained in Zlatopil were killed in August 1941. After World War II the Jews who survived in the Red Army returned to Zlatopil and buried the Jews of Zlatopil in a common grave in the old Jewish cemetery of Zlatopil. Today there are almost no Jews in Zlatopil.

Some of the most famous Jewish families of Zlatopol are: Brody, Rabbi Nachman of Breslov, rabbis Elijah and Hillel Poisic, (the composer) Pokrass, and Zola.

Notable people
Anna Bilińska (1857–1893) Polish painter
Lazar Brodsky (1848–1904) Imperial Russian businessman of Jewish origin, sugar magnate
Alexander Myshlayevsky (1856–1920) Imperial Russian general
Hillel Poisic (1881–1953) Imperial Russian rabbi
Milly Witkop (1877–1955) Imperial Russian anarcho-syndicalist of Jewish origin, feminist writer and activist

Gallery

References 

Zlatopol JewishGen

History of Kirovohrad Oblast
Chigirinsky Uyezd
Shtetls
Holocaust locations in Ukraine